Pervan may refer to:

Places in Bosnia
 Pervan Gornji
 Pervan Donji

People with the surname
 Đani Pervan ( from 1983) Bosnian musician
 Edoardo Pervan ( 1938), predecessor Italian Consul to the United States (at Philadelphia) of Armando Salati
 Marko Pervan (born 1996), Croatian footballer
 Pavao Pervan (born 1987), Austrian footballer
 Valentine Pervan, Australian educator recognised in the 1991 Queen's Birthday Honours
 Željko Pervan (born 1962), Croatian comedian

Croatian surnames